Mount Liberty is an unincorporated community in Washington Township, Brown County, in the U.S. state of Indiana.

History
A post office was established at Mount Liberty in 1856, and remained in operation until it was discontinued in 1932.

Geography

References

Unincorporated communities in Brown County, Indiana
Unincorporated communities in Indiana